is a Japanese actor and voice actor represented by Ōsawa Office. Takada has featured in numerous anime television series and drama series, and has also appeared as a narrator in numerous productions. In 1998, he made his debut in an anime with the Sunrise series, Gasaraki.

Works

Narration
Takeshi no Banbutsu Sōseiki (1995–2001, TV Asahi)
Tokumei Research 200X-II (2002–2004, Nippon TV)
Tensai Terebikun (1993-, NHK)

Anime television series
Argento Soma (Frank, Yuri Leonov, Defense Official, Henry Harris)
Gasaraki (Kazukiyo Gōwa, Tsuna Watanabe)
Karakuri Kiden Hiwō Senki (Aka)
Code Geass: Lelouch of the Rebellion (Kyōshirō Tōdō)
s-CRY-ed (Martin Zigmarl)
SPEED GRAPHER (Tatsumi Saiga)
BRIGADOON: Marin to Melan (Tadashi Tokita, Paion Silver)
Full Metal Panic! (Andy)
Hellsing (Chris Pickman)
Popotan (Keith)
Meitantei Conan (Tendō Tōru, Kansuke Yamato)
City Hunter (Jack Douglas)
Sword Art Online: Alicization Vassago's Father

OVA
Argento Soma Phase: EX Tokubetsu-hen (Henry Harris)

Drama CD
Argento Soma: CD Drama (Frank, Yuri)
s-CRY-ed Sound Edition: Ryūhō-hen (Martin Jigmar)

Games
Persona2 Batsu (a.k.a. Persona2 Eternal Punishment.) (Katsuya Suō)

CD-ROM
Romantic Kaidō: Rekishi to Ongaku no Tabi

CM
Death Note: the Last name (Movie; Narration)

External links
 

1960 births
Living people
Japanese male video game actors
Japanese male voice actors
Male voice actors from Kanagawa Prefecture
20th-century Japanese male actors
21st-century Japanese male actors